Ndumu Nji Vincent  born October 16, 1960, is a Cameroonian civil engineer ,who served as Government Delegate to the Bamenda City Council from March 2009 to February 2020 He also served as President of the GCE Board Tender. He is married (Hilda Ndumu Swiri) and father of 4 children. Appointed by Presidential Decree, he has been government delegate since March 2, 2009, when he took over from Tadzong Abel Ndeh who had served for 16 years. Before being in charge of this, he worked for the Ministry Of Public Works and in charge of weighing stations at the Prime minister's office. He at that time was a Technical Advisor(Conseiller Technique).

Widely regarded by many as the man who changed Bamenda, his no tolerance has lifted Bamenda from a city filled with  containers into a city which is reaching modernisation  with great population growth " . Credit is given from his many years as a seasoned civil engineer(from the University of Manchester)

References

Cameroonian engineers
1960 births
Living people
People from Bamenda